Camp of Fire is a slum development programme in Nairobi, Kenya initiated by Slum Dwellers International, where established slum-dwellers have promised to build proper houses, schools, and community centers without any government money, in return for land they have been illegally squatting on for 30 years.

References

Charities based in Kenya
Slums in Kenya
Organisations based in Nairobi
Squatters' movements